Vibe Vixen is a magazine geared towards female readers of Vibe Magazine that covered fashion, beauty, dating, entertainment, sex, and societal issues for "urban minded females". The magazine was initially released in fall of 2004 and sales were considered successful enough for the magazine to be issued on a quarterly basis. The magazine went online in April 2013 and publishes regular content.

Stars who graced Vibe Vixen's covers included Ciara, Tracee Ellis Ross, Kimora Lee Simmons, Ariana Grande, Serena Williams, Kelis, and Wendy Williams.

References

External links
 Official Vibe Vixen Magazine website

African-American magazines
Fashion magazines published in the United States
Online music magazines published in the United States
Quarterly magazines published in the United States
Defunct women's magazines published in the United States
Hip hop magazines
Magazines established in 2004
Magazines disestablished in 2013
Magazines published in New York City
Online magazines with defunct print editions
Women's fashion magazines